In Irish mythology, hungry grass (also known as fairy grass) is a patch of cursed grass. Anyone walking on it was doomed to perpetual and insatiable hunger.

Harvey suggests that the hungry grass is cursed by the proximity of an unshriven corpse (the fear gorta). William Carleton's stories suggest that faeries plant the hungry grass. According to Harvey this myth may relate to beliefs formed in the Great Famine of the 1840s. In Margaret McDougall's letters the phrase "hungry grass" is - by analogy to the myth - used to describe hunger pains.

This mythology has expanded to rural Missouri in the 1800's. Following the earthquake of 1811 a shapeless creature was found to harass the hemp farmers of the countryside. Irish immigrants to the area dubbed this mysterious, shapeless, creature "The Gortach of Missouri". Crop destruction, business follies, and other calamities fell upon the farmers and associated businesses. In 1910 it was discovered that hemp farmers who often smoked hemp on their veranda every night were exempt from these attacks. The Gortach of Missouri is believed to be suppressed by holding an annual celebration in clear defiance of the creature. Starting with the cannabis prohibition of 1937 the event was lost over time. With hemp and cannabis making a resurgence in Missouri, the festival has been revived. South Central Missouri, deep in the Ozarks, is both the origin of the Missouri Gortach and the location of the celebration each year.

See also
 Hungry ghost

References

Irish mythology
Mythological plants
Grasses